Americanization refers to the influence the United States of America has on the culture of other countries.

Americanization may also refer to:
 Americanization (immigration), the process of assimilation of foreign immigrants into the US
 Americanization (foreign culture and media), the modification of foreign media to suit American tastes
 Cultural assimilation of Native Americans, the attempted assimilation of Native American cultures as a policy of the US government  1850 –  1920
 Americanization (Vietnam War), a time period in the Vietnam War, roughly the years of President Lyndon B. Johnson